Sven Magnusson (30 April 1908 – 30 September 1962) was a Swedish stage and film actor. He appeared frequently at the Helsingborg City Theatre.

Selected filmography
 Frida's Songs (1930)
 The Atlantic Adventure (1934)
 65, 66 and I (1936)
 His Excellency (1944)
 En dag skall gry (1944)
 Live Dangerously (1944)
 The Forest Is Our Heritage (1944)
Widower Jarl (1945)
 The Wedding on Solö (1946)
 Desire (1946)
 Rail Workers (1947)
 Realm of Man (1949)
 When Love Came to the Village (1950)
 Andersson's Kalle (1950)
 Stronger Than the Law (1951)
 A Ghost on Holiday (1951)
 Bom the Flyer (1952)
 Barabbas (1953)
 The Beat of Wings in the Night (1953)
 The Girl from Backafall (1953)
 Enchanted Walk (1954)
 Men in the Dark (1955)
 A Little Nest (1956)
 The Girl in Tails (1956)
 Ticket to Paradise (1962)

References

Bibliography
 Nash, Jay Robert & Ross, Stanley Ralph. The Motion Picture Guide, Volume 6. Cinebooks, 1985.

External links

1908 births
1962 deaths
Swedish male film actors
Swedish male stage actors
People from Bollnäs
20th-century Swedish male actors